Cartoon Network is a Pakistani cable and satellite television channel operated by Warner Bros. Discovery. It was launched on 2 April 2004, dedicating itself to Pakistani and Bangladeshi viewers. The channel primarily airs animated programming. It is the Pakistani version of the American network of the same name.

History 
Before the launch of the dedicated feed, the Indian feed of Cartoon Network was broadcast in Pakistan and Bangladesh. Then due to increasing localisation of the Indian feed, Turner launched a new feed on 2 April 2004, targeted to Pakistani and Bangladeshi audiences.

On 1 October 2011, Cartoon Network Pakistan changed its logo a second time along with the other Asia Pacific feeds, joining the ‘CN’ squares into a perfect rectangle. The channel also premiered The Amazing World of Gumball on the same day.

Cartoon Network, along with all other foreign television channels, was temporarily suspended in Bangladesh on 2 October 2021, for not broadcasting clean feed according to a policy passed in 2006. On 21 January 2022, Cartoon Network Pakistan began offering television series such as Ben 10 and We Bare Bears dubbed in Urdu. Along with the Indian feed, Cartoon Network Pakistan began using the "Redraw Your World" branding and graphics on 30 March 2022.

Programming

Criticism and controversy
In 2005, Pakistan Electronic Media Regulatory Authority issued an order regarding the ban of several non-private channels because they were airing programmes in Hindi that were dubbed in India. Later, Cartoon Network switched to English versions on the PEMRA's instructions but the mixed Hindustani feed of the channel was back after a few months.

In early 2010, PEMRA again issued a notice against the non-private channels, which resulted in a complete ban of Nickelodeon and Cartoon Network's Pakistan feed. Once again, the issue was the Hindi dubbed shows on its schedule line up and the government's demand for a private kids' channel affiliated with PTV instead. The ban stayed and was not lifted till the end of July 2011.

On 1 August, an announcement was made by the Minister for Information and Broadcasting, Firdous Ashiq Awan. She said "Cartoon Network and Nickelodeon, have been granted permission to air programmes in Pakistan." But at the closure, she expressed her interest in a private TV channel once again and said, "The Pakistan Electronic Media Regulatory Authority will accommodate private TV channel if someone wished to launch channel for children."

See also
 List of children's television channels in South Asia
 Cartoon Network
 Cartoon Network HD+
 Cartoon Network (India)
 Pogo

References

Cartoon Network
Children's television channels in Pakistan
Television channels and stations established in 2004
Pakistani subsidiaries of foreign companies
English-language television stations in Pakistan
Television stations in Karachi
Animation controversies in television
Television controversies in Pakistan
Television channels in Bangladesh